J2M may refer to:

Mitsubishi J2M, Raiden (Thunderbolt), Allied reporting name "Jack," a World War II-era fighter aircraft
Movement 2 June, a former West German militant group based in West Berlin
Jean-Marie Messier, the former CEO of Vivendi